Michael McCloud (born 1947) is the stage name of Michael Snyder, an American folk singer and songwriter who regularly performs at the Schooner Wharf Bar in Key West, Florida.
His album Ain't Life Grand features the lead guitar playing of the late "Doctor" George Turner.
He gained national attention after filing a formal complaint for copyright infringement against country music star Toby Keith in 2006. McCloud claimed that Keith's 2003 hit song "I Love This Bar" was copied largely from McCloud's work, "Tourist Town Bar."

In 2009, McCloud released volumes 1 and 2 of his CD, Live As I Can Be.

References

Living people
1947 births
American folk singers